Financial Services Authority (OJK) is an Indonesian government agency which regulates and supervises the financial services sector. Its head office is in Jakarta.

The OJK is an autonomous agency designed to be free from any interference, having functions, duties, and powers to regulate, supervise, inspect, and investigate. The agency was established in 2011 to replace the role of Bapepam-LK in regulating and supervising the capital market and financial institutions, as well as that of Bank Indonesia in regulating and supervising banks, and to protect consumers of financial services industry.

After the passage of the Law on Financial Sector Development and Strengthening, Indonesian government eventually elevated the authority to the special status and integrated it to the law enforcement system in Indonesia.

History
The agency was created in 2011 under the Act No. 21 of 2011 which organised system of regulation and supervision of financial services.  It replaced the functions of the Capital Market and Financial Institutions Supervisory Agency (Badan Pengawas Pasar Modal dan Lembaga Keuangan) or Bapepam-LK in short.

Functions
The Financial Services Authority was formed so that the whole activities in the financial services sector:
 are working in ordered, fair, transparent, and accountable manners;
 are able to create a financial system which grows continuously and in a stable manner; and
 are able to protect the interests of consumers and the society.

The agency investigates financial crimes.

Member banks
All member banks are registered and supervised by the organization, and are required to carry the statement indicating such in advertising.
 Bank Mandiri
 Bank Central Asia
 Bank Negara Indonesia
 Bank Bukopin
 Bank Rakyat Indonesia
 Bank Permata
 Bank Mega
 Bank Nobu
 Bank Danamon
 Bank OCBC NISP
 Bank CIMB Niaga
 Bank Tabungan Pensiunan Nasional
 Bank Internasional Indonesia
 Bank Tabungan Negara

Islamic banks
 Bank Syariah Indonesia
 Bank Syariah Mandiri
 Bank BNI Syariah
 Bank BRI Syariah
 Bank BCA Syariah
 Bank Muamalat
 Bank Mega Syariah
 Bank Panin Syariah
 Bank Syariah Bukopin

See also
 Securities Commission
 Economy of Indonesia

References

External links
 Official site

Indonesia
Government agencies of Indonesia
Law enforcement in Indonesia